DZ Deathrays (previously Denzel then DZ) are an Australian dance-punk trio from Brisbane, Queensland. Composed of Shane Parsons (vocals/guitar), Lachlan Ewbank (lead guitar/vocals) and Simon Ridley (drums), they put out two EPs before releasing their debut album, Bloodstreams, in April 2012. The album won the ARIA Award for Best Hard Rock or Heavy Metal Album at the ARIA Music Awards of 2012. To date they have released five studio albums: Bloodstreams , Black Rat, Bloody Lovely, Positive Rising: Part 1 and Positive Rising: Part 2

History

2008–2011: Early years
Parsons and Ridley (both from Bundaberg, Queensland, Australia) were initially the founding members of Brisbane band Velociraptor, and continue to play with the group. Following the formation of DZ Deathrays, the band's first performances occurred at Brisbane house parties. The debut recording for the band was an EP, titled Ruined My Life, that was released in 2009 and its entire content was recorded live at a house party. The band's sophomore EP, Brutal Tapes, was released in January 2011 on their Bandcamp. A Re-issue containing more songs was released by label I Oh You, in 2014.

2012–2013: Bloodstreams 

DZ Deathrays released their debut album, Bloodstreams, in April 2012 and received praise from Pitchfork Media, with reviewer Laura Snapes writing that the album is "more than worth going deaf to." The album was co-produced by electro artist Richard Pike and was recorded in Queensland during a two-week period. It was released in the UK in May 2012 on the Hassle label and NME reviewer Kelly Murray explained: "This album has the potential to make your little sister want to shave her head and invest in mock leather hotpants. It’s the penned seduction of a weekend of irresponsibility and a Monday full of inferior excuses."

2014–2016: Black Rat 

The band's second album was recorded with producer Burke Reid at the Grove Studios complex, located adjacent to the Strickland Forest, north of Sydney, Australia, in January 2014. The band recorded with Reid for a two-week period—a 9 January Facebook post from the band read: "Producer Burke Reid tinkering away at about 3am. Sounding brutal." The band's press release for the album states that the recording is "a rich, deep collection of sounds, textures and arrangements". In the promotional material that accompanied review copies of the album, Parsons described the album as "definitely a night-time record. After 9pm; that's where it finds its place."

In early April 2014, the band signed with the Infectious Records music company for the release of Black Rat in the United Kingdom (UK). The band toured the UK during April 2014, appearing at the Liverpool Sound City event, prior to the UK release of the album in August 2014. The duo released their second studio album Black Rat in both Australia and the United States (US) in May 2014.

In early May 2014, writing for the Australian newspaper, music journalist Andrew McMillen awarded Black Rat 3.5 stars out of a possible 5. McMillen describes Bloodstreams as comparatively juvenile alongside Black Rat, and writes that the more mature sound better suits the duo, as they move beyond their "trash party" origins. McMillen further praises the album's 11 songs as a "significant step forward" and concludes: "... it's [Black Rat] the sound of a confident band torn between its populist, party-friendly beginnings and a new-found ability to embrace glimpses of beauty amid the sonic destruction." On 18 May, the album peaked at No. 23 on the ARIA Charts for one week.

2017–2018: Bloody Lovely

The duo released the single "Shred for Summer" in August 2017, it placed within Australian radio station Triple J's Hottest 100, 2017 at no. 67. Their next single "Bad Influence" was released in September, with another, "Total Meltdown" following in November. "Total Meltdown" just missed out placing no. 109 within the Hottest 200 of 2017. The three singles would later be included in their third studio album.

Their third studio album, Bloody Lovely, was released on I Oh You Records and Alcopop! Records on 2 February 2018. Triple J picked it as their feature album of the week. Three days after the album was released the single "Like People" included in the album was released. The music video for the single featured one of the original members of The Wiggles, Murray Cook. On 18 February, the album peaked at No. 4 on the ARIA Charts and remained there for a total of two weeks. Then-touring guitarist Lachlan Ewbank helped in writing the album and was considered a fully-fledged member of the band. He was later officially inducted as a full-time member of the band.

On 14 September the band joined with The Gooch Palms for Like a Version on Triple J where they played their original, "Like People", and their cover of "Love Shack" by the B52s.

2019- present: Positive Risings 
On 10 January 2019, via DZ Deathrays' Twitter, the trio stated that they were about to commence recording their fourth studio album. On 14 January, it was announced that DZ Deathrays would perform a national tour titled "Tour With the Lot". The tour is set to run from March to April with support from Moaning Lisa and The Buoys. On 4 February, they confirmed that their fourth studio album was completed, further details are yet to be announced.

On 1 March, coinciding with the beginning of their Tour With the Lot, DZ Deathrays released a new single entitled "Front Row Hustle". A reworking of their track "Afterglow" from their 2018 album, Bloody Lovely, remixed by Trials of A.B. Original. It features Briggs, also of A.B. Original, and rising star Jesswar. An accompanying music video preceded the single's release. On 14 June, their fourth studio album Positive Rising: Part 1 was confirmed for a release of 30 August. On the same day, the trio released a new single "IN-TO-IT" alongside an accompanying music video.

In October 2020, the band released "Fired Up", the lead single from Positive Rising: Part 2, which was released on 9 July 2021.

Touring
DZ Deathrays have toured throughout over 15 countries, including Australia, the UK, the US and Canada. In the promotional material for the band's second album, Parsons explained that the band had spent the preceding two years drinking and touring, a period in which the songs for Black Rat were created.

To promote Bloodstreams, the DZ Deathrays performed at festivals such as the Reading and Leeds Festivals (UK), the A Perfect Day Festival (Villafranca di Verona, Italy), Splendour in the Grass (Australia) and St Jerome's Laneway Festival (Australia), and headlined the NME stage at The Great Escape Festival, held in Brighton and Hove, UK. The band's performance at the US South by Southwest (SXSW) event in Austin, Texas was shortened, due to the extreme volume of their music. Musical touring partners include Blood Red Shoes, TRUST, Foo Fighters and Unknown Mortal Orchestra.

Influences
In April 2014, Ridley identified seven albums that "changed his life" for the Australian Tone Deaf music website. Included in the list are Smash by The Offspring, which was not only the first album that Ridley owned, but "also the first album with swearing on it"; The Bronx's first self-titled album, "a psych up album for nights when I'm too tired but need to party"; Air's Moon Safari, which is an album that was listened to after Ridley would "come home from work every day" and "melt into the couch"—he stated that he now listens to the album on a weekly basis; and Rust in Peace by Megadeth, praised by Ridley for being "Metal how it should be!"

Members
 Shane Parsons – lead vocals, guitar (2008–present)
 Simon Ridley – drums, percussion, backing vocals (2008–present)
 Lachlan Ewbank – guitar, backing vocals (2018–present; touring member 2015–2018)

Former touring members
 Mitchell 'Mood' Gregory – guitar

Discography

Studio albums

Extended plays

Singles

Music videos

Awards and nominations

AIR Awards
The Australian Independent Record Awards (commonly known informally as AIR Awards) is an annual awards night to recognise, promote and celebrate the success of Australia's Independent Music sector.

|-
| rowspan="2" | AIR Awards of 2012
| rowspan="2" |Bloodstreams 
| Best Independent Album
| 
|-
| Best Independent Hard Rock or Punk Album
| 
|-
| AIR Awards of 2014
|Black Rat
| Best Independent Hard Rock or Punk Album
| 
|-
| AIR Awards of 2019
| Bloody Lovely
| Best Independent Hard Rock, Heavy or Punk Album
| 
|-
| AIR Awards of 2020
| Positive Rising: Part 1
| Best Independent Punk Album or EP
| 
|-
| AIR Awards of 2022
| Positive Rising: Part 2
| Best Independent Punk Album or EP
| 
|-

ARIA Music Awards
The ARIA Music Awards are a set of annual ceremonies presented by Australian Recording Industry Association (ARIA), which recognise excellence, innovation, and achievement across all genres of the music of Australia. They commenced in 1987. 

|-
| 2012
|Bloodstreams 
| Best Hard Rock/Heavy Metal Album
| 
|-
| rowspan="2"|2014
| rowspan="2"|Black Rat 
| Best Hard Rock/Heavy Metal Album
| 
|-
| Best Cover Art
| 
|-
| 2018
|Bloody Lovely
| Best Hard Rock/Heavy Metal Album
| 
|-
| 2019
|Positive Rising: Part 1
| Best Hard Rock/Heavy Metal Album
| 
|-

J Awards
The J Awards are an annual series of Australian music awards that were established by the Australian Broadcasting Corporation's youth-focused radio station Triple J. They commenced in 2005.

|-
| J Awards of 2018
| "Like People"
| Australian Video of the Year
|

National Live Music Awards
The National Live Music Awards (NLMAs) are a broad recognition of Australia's diverse live industry, celebrating the success of the Australian live scene. The awards commenced in 2016.

|-
| rowspan="2"| National Live Music Awards of 2016
| themselves
| Live Hard Rock Act of the Year
| 
|-
| Simon Ridley (DZ Deathrays)
| Live Drummer of the Year
| 
|-
| National Live Music Awards of 2019
| themselves
| Live Hard Rock Act of the Year
| 
|-

Queensland Music Awards
The Queensland Music Awards (previously known as Q Song Awards) are annual awards celebrating Queensland, Australia's brightest emerging artists and established legends. They commenced in 2006.

 (wins only)
|-
| 2011
| "Gebbie Street"
| Rock Song of the Year
| 
|-
| 2012
| themselves
| Export Achievement Award 
| 
|-
| 2020
| "Still No Change"
| Heavy Song of the Year
| 
|-
|}

See also
Music in Brisbane

References

External links
Official website
I Oh You

ARIA Award winners
Musical groups from Brisbane
Rock music duos
2008 establishments in Australia
Musical groups established in 2008
Australian alternative rock groups
Alcopop! Records artists